The Call is an American daily newspaper published seven days per week in Woonsocket, Rhode Island, covering northern Providence County, Rhode Island, and some adjacent towns in Massachusetts.

Originally an afternoon newspaper known as The Evening Call, the Woonsocket paper has published seven mornings a week since the 1990s. It is owned by RISN Operations Inc.

History
The Evening Call was founded in 1892 by Samuel E. Hudson and Andrew J. McConnell, who predicted that "the people of Woonsocket will support a paper devoted to their local and business interests," "essentially, a paper for the people."

Hudson's and McConnell's descendants—Buell W. Hudson, Charles W. Palmer, Andrew P. Palmer and Nancy E. Hudson—ran the paper for nearly 90 years before selling it to Ingersoll Publications in 1984. Ingersoll in turn was bought by Journal Register Company in 1989.

In 2007, a new company, RISN, formed to purchase Journal Register's Rhode Island properties, including The Call and systematically fired a large number of employees.

Sisters and competitors 
In its coverage area, The Call competes with the state's largest daily, the Providence Journal. It also competes in nearby Massachusetts towns with the Worcester Telegram & Gazette and the Milford Daily News.

RISN Operations also owns two other daily newspapers in Rhode Island, The Times of Pawtucket (which shares a publisher with The Call), the Kent County Daily Times of West Warwick, as well as several weekly newspapers. All of these properties were sold for $8.3 million to RISN in early 2007 by Journal Register Company.

References

External links
 Woonsocket Call website

Newspapers published in Rhode Island
Woonsocket, Rhode Island
RISN Operations
Newspapers established in 1892
1892 establishments in Rhode Island